Allestree Woodlands School (formerly Woodlands School) is a coeducational academy secondary school and sixth form in Derby, England.

Admissions
The academy currently has around 1,350 students on roll. The school enrols an average of 220 students each year.

History
The academy was opened as Woodlands Secondary Modern School in 1956. It became a comprehensive in 1975, and was awarded specialist status as a Technology College in September 2004.  It converted to an academy in 2012.

The academy had buildings constructed under the CLASP system, however these were demolished throughout 2016 as part of the academy's renovation.

In 2013, the academy was approved under the Priority School Building Programme, along with seven other Derby City schools. The new buildings were designed by Maber with a budget of £13.9 million.

Construction of the new site was managed by Bowmer & Kirkland. Demolition of parts of the old academy buildings began in late 2014, and construction of the new buildings beginning soon after.

Houses
The academy has four houses, named after different common woodland trees. Each house represented by a colour.

 Cedar (yellow)
 Maple (red)
 Oak (green)
 Rowan (blue)

The academy is managed differently to other schools with houses carrying much more than ceremonial roles. Secondary Students are required to wear a school tie with corresponding house colours and are assigned a Head of House who has extra disciplinary control over students.

Academic performance
The academy usually obtains average or higher than average Secondary results. However, it has a lower than average Progress 8 score of -0.35.

In a 2018 Ofsted inspection, the school was rated as Requires Improvement, the third rating in the Ofsted four-point system.

Notable alumni 

Chris Beardsley - Former footballer
Nigel Clough - Former footballer, former managers of Derby County Football club and Burton Albion Football club
Jamie East -  TV presenter, broadcaster, journalist and singer-songwriter
Bob Laxton - former local MP for Derby North.
Jyoti Mishra - Musician
LostAlone -  Steven Battelle and Mark Gibson (founders of the band) met while attending the school.

Citations

External links
 Official website

Secondary schools in Derby
Academies in Derby
Educational institutions established in 1956
1956 establishments in England